Ximena Morla Lynch (1891–1987), also known as Ximena Morla de Subercaseaux, was a Chilean feminist writer and painter. The daughter of writer Luisa Lynch and conservative politician  , she had five siblings, including , a diplomat, and Carmen, a writer. Her granddaughter is the novelist Elizabeth Subercaseaux.

Work
Part of her literary output is known to be unpublished or scattered in newspapers and magazines – as is also the case with other feminist writers of the era such as her mother and sister, María Luisa Fernández, and Sara Hübner de Fresno. Her literary work is considered to be part of the early 20th century avant-garde that sought to massify feminist thinking and fight for women's rights.

For some authors, her work can be framed within so-called "aristocratic feminism", along with other writers such as Elvira Santa Cruz Ossa, Blanca Santa Cruz Ossa, Inés Echeverría Bello, María Mercedes Vial, Teresa Wilms Montt, María Luisa Fernández, and Mariana Cox Méndez.

The spiritism sessions that she held with her sister Carmen in the early 20th century have inspired plays and novels. In Grupo 7, – the Morlas' esoteric circle to which painter María Tupper (1893–1965) also belonged – Ximena was the main medium, although her sister Carmen also functioned as such. Her astral name was Vera, her sister's was Nakinko, her mother's was Asiul, and Tupper's was Cirineo.

As a painter, she made portraits in oil on canvas. She was also an "illustrator and creator of imaginative compositions of native style."

Painting exhibitions

Individual
 1977: Municipality of Zapallar, Zapallar, Chile

Group
 1915: Exposición Anual de Bellas Artes, Salón Oficial, Santiago
 1927: Exposición de Bellas Artes, Salón Oficial, Santiago
 1936: Exposición Nacional de Artes Plásticas de Valparaíso
 1963: Salón Oficial de Artes Plásticas, Santiago
 1975: La Mujer en el Arte, Museo Nacional de Bellas artes, Santiago

References

1891 births
1987 deaths
20th-century Chilean painters
20th-century Chilean women writers
20th-century Chilean non-fiction writers
20th-century Chilean women artists
Chilean people of Irish descent
Chilean women painters
Chilean painters
Chilean feminist writers
Chilean expatriates in France